Dallam County is the north-westernmost county in the U.S. state of Texas. As of the 2020 Census, its population was 7,115. Its county seat is Dalhart. The county was founded in 1876 and later organized in 1891. It is named for James Wilmer Dallam, a lawyer and newspaper publisher.

History
Dallam County was formed in 1876 from portions of Bexar County. It was named after James Wilmer Dallam, the lawyer who made the first digest of Texas laws. The first settlement in the area followed in 1870, which resulted in the Red River War of 1874 and 1875 with the native Comanche and Kiowa tribes. In 1900–01, the Chicago, Rock Island and Pacific Railroad company built a stretch from Liberal, Kansas, to Tucumcari, New Mexico, which ran through the county. The location where the tracks met those of the Fort Worth and Denver Railway was named Dalhart. The name is taken from the first letters of Dallam County and Hartley County, between which the town's area is divided. Within a short time, the small railroad stop turned into a sizable town and was named county seat in 1903.

Dallam County was one of the hardest-hit areas in the Dust Bowl.

Geography

Dallam County is one of only three counties in Texas to border two other U.S. states (the others being Bowie and Cass). Dallam County forms part of the tripoint—of Texas-Oklahoma-New Mexico.

Major highways
  U.S. Highway 54
  U.S. Highway 87
  U.S. Highway 287
  U.S. Highway 385
  State Highway 102

Adjacent counties
 Cimarron County, Oklahoma (north)
 Sherman County (east)
 Moore County (southeast)
 Hartley County (south)
 Union County, New Mexico (west)

National protected area
 Rita Blanca National Grassland (part)

Demographics

Note: the US Census treats Hispanic/Latino as an ethnic category. This table excludes Latinos from the racial categories and assigns them to a separate category. Hispanics/Latinos can be of any race.

As of the census of 2000, there were 6,222 people, 2,317 households, and 1,628 families residing in the county.  The population density was 4 people per square mile (2/km2). There were 2,697 housing units at an average density of 2 per square mile (1/km2). The racial makeup of the county was 82.64% White, 1.64% Black or African American, 0.90% Native American, 0.21% Asian, 12.41% from other races, and 2.20% from two or more races.  28.38% of the population were Hispanic or Latino of any race. In terms of ancestry, 19.6% were of German, 8,2% were of Irish, 7,1 % were of English, 5,5% were of American, 2,8% were of French, 2,7 % were of Scotch-Irish, 1,6% were of Dutch.

There were 2,317 households, out of which 39.00% had children under the age of 18 living with them, 55.10% were married couples living together, 9.70% had a female householder with no husband present, and 29.70% were non-families. 26.20% of all households were made up of individuals, and 10.00% had someone living alone who was 65 years of age or older.  The average household size was 2.68 and the average family size was 3.24.

In the county, the population was spread out, with 31.80% under the age of 18, 8.60% from 18 to 24, 28.80% from 25 to 44, 20.60% from 45 to 64, and 10.30% who were 65 years of age or older.  The median age was 31 years. For every 100 females there were 102.00 males.  For every 100 females age 18 and over, there were 101.30 males.

The median income for a household in the county was $27,946, and the median income for a family was $33,558. Males had a median income of $27,244 versus $19,000 for females. The per capita income for the county was $13,653.  About 11.30% of families and 14.10% of the population were below the poverty line, including 15.40% of those under age 18 and 24.80% of those age 65 or over.

Politics 
Dallam County is located within District 86 of the Texas House of Representatives. The seat has been held by Amarillo attorney John T. Smithee, a Republican, since 1985. Dallam County as a whole is heavily Republican in orientation.

Education
The following school districts serve Dallam County:
 Dalhart Independent School District
 Stratford Independent School District
 Texline Independent School District

Communities

City
 Dalhart (county seat) (partly in Hartley County)

Towns
 Coldwater
 Texline

Unincorporated community
 Conlen
 Kerrick

Ghost Town
 Perico

See also

 List of museums in the Texas Panhandle
 National Register of Historic Places listings in Dallam County, Texas
 Recorded Texas Historic Landmarks in Dallam County

References

External links

 Dallam County commissioners’ website
 Dallam County in Handbook of Texas Online at the University of Texas
 Dallam County Profile from the Texas Association of Counties 
 The XIT Ranch claims to have been the largest range in the world "under fence"

 
1891 establishments in Texas
Populated places established in 1891
Texas Panhandle
Majority-minority counties in Texas